HTC EVO 4G+ (codenamed HTC Rider) is an Android smartphone developed by HTC Corporation, released exclusively in South Korea through Korea Telecom in 2011.A variation of HTC Evo 3D, the device is distinguished by its single 8 MP rear camera, which means all the 3D specificities are gone, and is running on Korea Telecom's WiBro network.

History
The phone is compatible with Korea Telecom's WiBro network, however, unlike its predecessor HTC Evo 4G, it is a GSM/UTMS cellphone.It is also known as HTC Rider, which is similar to HTC Raider, an LTE enabled device.

Features

Processor
The Evo 4G+ uses a Snapdragon S3 chipset with a dual core 1.2 GHz processor, and includes 1 GB of RAM.

Screen
The Evo 4G+ has a 4.3 inch qHD screen with Super LCD display.

Camera
Unlike its counterpart, HTC Evo 3D, the Evo 4G+ has only one single rear-facing 8-megapixel camera, capable of capturing videos in 1080p resolution in 2D. It features a single 1.3-megapixel front-facing camera.

Software
The Evo 4G+ shipped with Android 2.3 and the HTC Sense 3.0 interface. An update was released on June 19, 2012 to upgrade the phone to Android 4.0.3 with Sense 3.6.

Storage
The Evo 4G+ features 4 GB internal storage (about 1.3 GB available) and a pre-installed 8 GB microSDHC card.

See also
List of Android devices

References

External links
 Official HTC Evo 4G+ website

Evo 4G+